Papilio neyi is a species of swallowtail butterfly from the genus Papilio that is found in Ecuador, French Guiana, Peru and Brazil.

Subspecies
Papilio neyi neyi (Ecuador)
Papilio neyi bedoci Le Cerf, 1925 (French Guiana)
Papilio neyi josianae (Möhn, 2001) (Peru)

Taxonomy
Papilio neyi is in the Papilio zagreus species group. This clade has two members.

Papilio zagreus
Papilio neyi (may be a form or subspecies of zagreus)

References

External links
Images at Swallowtails.net

neyi
Papilionidae of South America
Lepidoptera of Brazil
Lepidoptera of Ecuador
Lepidoptera of French Guiana
Lepidoptera of Peru
Butterflies described in 1909